András Giró-Szász (born 1970) is a Hungarian historian and political scientist, who served as the spokesman of the Hungarian government between 12 September 2011 and 6 June 2014.

References
 Kormanyszovivo.hu

1970 births
Living people
Hungarian political scientists
21st-century Hungarian historians
Government spokespersons of Hungary